Com Lag (2plus2isfive) is a compilation EP by the English rock band Radiohead, released in 2004. It collects B-sides from Radiohead's sixth album, Hail to the Thief (2003), along with remixes by Cristian Vogel and Four Tet and two live performances.

Music 
"Paperbag Writer", whose title references the Beatles song "Paperback Writer", features "sinister fractured funk". "I Am a Wicked Child" is a "tainted, eerie missive" with harmonica. "Where Bluebirds Fly" is a "rattling, fidgety" electronic piece Radiohead used as the introduction music for their Hail to the Thief tour. "I Will (Los Angeles Version)" is an alternative version of "I Will" from Hail to the Thief, and "Fog (Again)" is a live performance of the Amnesiac B-side "Fog", rearranged for piano.

Cover art 
The cover art is by artist Stanley Donwood, who has designed all artwork for Radiohead since 1994. Donwood said he imagined a range of Delftware that featured "a modified bear, and a despot sperm monster". A jigsaw puzzle based on the cover was released in 2020.

Release 
Com Lag was released in Japan and Australia on 24 March 2004, in Canada on 13 April 2004, the United Kingdom on 16 April 2007, and in the United States on 8 May 2007. Early Japanese pressings were printed with a fault that produced static in some tracks.

Critical reception
Com Lag received mixed reviews. The NME critic Anthony Thornton wrote: "Never content with relaxing into an accepted way of doing things, this record, while being flawed – it is a B-sides compilation after all – confirms Radiohead as the true inheritors of the Beatles' legacy rather than Oasis." Adam Downer of Sputnikmusic wrote: "While Com Lag does have its flaws, it's not a bad set of B-sides. Some of it is actually fantastic."

The Paste critic Jeff Elbel described the Com Lag as "an appealing but inessential curio". AllMusic's Andy Kellman wrote: "Naturally, the release isn't nearly as cohesive as Hail to the Thief; its apparent intent is to supply the fans with another stream of the band's recordings, regardless of both how they fit together and how mixed the tracks are to begin with." Chris Ott of Pitchfork wrote: "You'd expect more from ideas that Radiohead fleshed out as a unit, but the stolen-time experiments and solo performances on this EP's tail end far outshine its exhausting first half."

Track listing 

All songs written by Radiohead.

 "2 + 2 = 5" (Live at Earls Court, London, 26 November 2003) – 3:34
 "Remyxomatosis" (Cristian Vogel Remix) – 5:08
 "I Will" (Los Angeles Version) – 2:13
 "Paperbag Writer" – 3:58
 "I Am a Wicked Child" – 3:05
 "I Am Citizen Insane" – 3:32
 "Skttrbrain" (Four Tet Remix) – 4:26
 "Gagging Order" – 3:35
 "Fog (Again)" (Live) – 2:19
 "Where Bluebirds Fly" – 4:23
 "2 + 2 = 5" (Live Video) – 4:01

Personnel 
 Radiohead – production
 Nigel Godrich – production, engineering
 Graeme Stewart – engineering
 Darrell Thorp – engineering
 Stanley Donwood – design
 Cristian Vogel – remixing
 Four Tet – remixing

Certifications

References

External links
 

2004 EPs
Radiohead EPs
Albums produced by Nigel Godrich
Capitol Records EPs
EMI Records EPs